The color killer is an electronic stage in color TV receiver sets which acts as a cutting circuit to cut off color processing when the TV set receives a monochrome signal.

Monochromatic transmission 
When a receiver is tuned to a monochrome transmission, the displayed scene should have no color components. However, if there is a hardware failure in the color killer stage, false color patterns may be displayed even during monochrome transmission.

In normal color reception, high frequency luminance is mistaken for color, causing relatively invisible false color patterns. The reason for this invisibility is due to a key feature of NTSC/PAL, chroma/luminance frequency interleaving, where these false patterns are in complementary colors for adjacent video frames, allowing the human eye to average out the false color patterns. If, during a monochrome transmission, a color killer failure allows the color processing to be activated when it shouldn't, a chroma subcarrier in the color processing stages is regenerated with no reference, causing that subcarrier to have enough frequency error that the chroma/luminance interleaving feature of NTSC/PAL no longer works, allowing the aforementioned false color patterns, overlaying the otherwise monochrome picture, to be much more visible by the human eye.

Also, when the color killer fails during a monochrome transmission, external noise caused by a weak signal shows up as colored confetti interference.

Color transmission 
In a color TV waveform, a reference pulse, called the burst, is transmitted along the back porch portion of the video signal. If the transmitted signal is monochromatic, then the burst is not transmitted. The color killer is actually a muting circuit in the chroma section which supervises the burst and turns off the color processing if no burst is received (i.e. when the received signal is monochromatic.) The main purpose of the color burst in the first place is a reference for the receiver to regenerate the chroma subcarrier, which in turn is utilized to demodulate the color difference signals.

High frequency external interference caused by poor reception conditions causes colored confetti interference overlaying the picture.

Equation 
In NTSC and PAL transmissions, the color TV signal can be represented as:

Color eraser (Mehikon) 
In the 1970s, the Israeli government considered the import of color televisions as frivolous and a luxury that would increase social gaps. Therefore, the government ordered the Israel Broadcasting Authority to cease broadcasting in color.  As it was impractical to strip out the chrominance signal from material recorded in color, this was accomplished by simply omitting the burst phase signal from the broadcast.  The "damaged" signal triggered the "color killer" mechanism, installed in color TV sets to prevent the appearance of color. This method was named Mehikon ( "eraser").

Soon after its introduction of the "Color eraser", special TV sets with an Anti-Mehikon ( "anti-eraser") device were offered. This device re-constructed the burst phase signal according to several known standards. The client had to turn a knob until the pictures on the screen appeared in natural colors. According to a report in Yediot Aharonoth from January 1979, clients had to adjust the knob every 15 minutes on average in normal conditions, or up to 10 times an hour when special problems occurred, in order to restore natural colors or if the picture suddenly turned black and white.

Based on information from owners of electricity appliance stores, the report estimated that 90% of those who bought color TV sets also bought the Anti-Mehikon device, which added about 5–10% to the price of the television.

Eventually, the Mehikon idea was proven to be futile, and the Israeli television stopped using it in 1980, allowing color transmissions to be received freely.

Notes

References 

Television technology
Color

he:אנטי-מחיקון